Floorshoogte Pass is a mountain pass situated in the Western Cape province of South Africa, on the Regional road R43 (Western Cape) between Bot River and Villiersdorp.

Mountain passes of the Western Cape